Zoey Ivory van der Koelen (born 5 July 1993) is a Dutch model and beauty pageant titleholder who won Miss Nederland 2016 and represented Netherlands in Miss Universe 2016 in Manila, Philippines.

Pageantry

Miss Nederland 2016
On 26 September 2016 Zoey was crowned Miss Nederland 2016 and now She represented the Netherlands at Miss Universe 2016.

Miss Universe 2016
Zoey represented the Netherlands during Miss Universe 2016, but did not place. Zoey did not win the crown, but gained fame for her dancing to Beyoncé's Single Ladies (Put a Ring On It), especially in the Philippines.

References

External links
 Website Miss Nederland

1993 births
Living people
Miss Universe 2016 contestants
Dutch beauty pageant winners